TAK-653 is an experimental drug being investigated as a treatment for treatment-resistant depression. It is being developed by Takeda (Millennium Pharmaceuticals, Inc.).

Mechanism of action 
TAK-653 is a selective positive allosteric modulator of the AMPA receptor. TAK-653 and other positive allosteric modulators potentiate the actions of agonist binding at the main site of the AMPA receptor by slowing the rate of desensitization and internalization of the receptor.

Antidepressant research 
There is evidence suggesting that activation of the AMPA receptor, downstream activation of mTOR, and upregulation of BDNF are central to the antidepressant effects of NMDA receptor antagonists such as ketamine. Blockage of the AMPA receptor nullifies the anti-depressant action of ketamine. By potentiating the effect of endogenous glutamate at the AMPA receptor, TAK-653 more directly influences AMPA receptor-mediated transcription.

The potential use of TAK-653 as a non-psychotomimetic (likely due to its lack of NMDA antagonist activity) is cited as reason for its investigation. Initial research found that TAK-653, unlike ketamine, did not induce hyperlocomoter responses in rats. However, a later human trial investigating the CNS stimulatory properties and tolerability of TAK-653 reported that although the CNS stimulatory properties of the drug were less pronounced than other psychostimulants, TAK-653 did appear to possess at least some stimulant-like effects. No severe adverse effects were noted in the trial.

AMPA receptor agonists are likely not viable for clinical applications as they present a risk of inducing seizures and overexcitation-induced neurotoxicity at doses close to their therapeutic window. TAK-653 possesses minimal direct AMPA agonist properties. TAK-653 provides a 419 fold safety margin against convulsions relative to therapeutic doses in rats.

References 

Antidepressants
Experimental drugs
Sulfonamides
Thiazines
Heterocyclic compounds with 2 rings